WorldNomads.com is a website that provides international travel insurance and travel safety services. Customers can buy the insurance after they have already left home and are already away traveling. The company is the recommended travel insurance partner of Lonely Planet.

In 2004, the company added travel blogs and a series of iPod phrase books to teach elementary travel phrases in several languages to members. In 2005, following the 2004 Indian Ocean earthquake and tsunami, World Nomads launched an experimental travel philanthropy program that they called Footprints, which has since developed into the Footprints network and as of January 2018 raised over $2.9 million by over 1 million travelers for community projects in the developing world.

In addition to selling travel insurance, World Nomads offers yearly travel scholarship opportunities in the fields of travel writing, travel photography and travel film making. Travelers can also supplement their travel experiences with the use of World Nomads Explore articles, Travel Safety content, and a series of travel guides.

References

External links
 Official WorldNomads.com website
 World Nomads Travel Scholarships
 World Nomads iPod Language Guides
Online Charity build the bottom line Travel Trends

Australian travel websites
Online insurance companies
Insurance companies of Australia